is the sixth single by Morning Musume subgroup Tanpopo. It was released on February 21, 2001, on the Zetima Records label. The single features the group's "second generation" line-up of Ai Kago, Rika Ishikawa, Kaori Iida and Mari Yaguchi. The first press edition contained a limited-edition trading card.

The songs from this single are featured on the compilation album All of Tanpopo. "Koi o Shichaimashita" is the second track on the disk, while "Baby Cry" is the eleventh track. The music video for the single is featured on Tanpopo Single V Clips 1.

Chart performance
The single peaked at #2 on the weekly Oricon charts, charting for nine weeks. It also made Oricon's year-end list of the 100 best-selling singles of 2001, ranking at #47.

A reported total of 238,880 copies were sold in the first week, and it is Tanpopo's best-selling single with 386,830 total copies sold.

Track listing

Covers
"Koi o Shichaimashita!" was covered by fellow Hello! Project group S/mileage on the limited edition versions of their fifth single, "Koi ni Booing Boo!", released in April 2011.

Members at time of single
 Kaori Iida
 Mari Yaguchi
 Ai Kago
 Rika Ishikawa

References

External links 
 single entry on the official Hello! Project site
Koi o Shichaimashita! entry at the official Up-Front Works discography

Tanpopo songs
2001 singles
Song recordings produced by Tsunku
Japanese-language songs
Songs written by Tsunku
2001 songs
Zetima Records singles